Michigan City station was a train station in Michigan City, Indiana served by Amtrak, the national railroad passenger system. It was served by two eastbound and one westbound Wolverine train at the time of closure; other Wolverine and  trains did not stop. The station had a platform shelter near the former prairie-style Michigan Central Railroad depot dating from 1915, which is now a local restaurant. That earlier station served Michigan Central Railroad, and later, New York Central passenger trains. Major NYC named trains passing through the station included the Canadian (east to Detroit and Toronto), the Chicago Mercury (east to Detroit) and the Wolverine (NYC train) (east to New York via Detroit and southwestern Canada, in contrast to the modern train).

Service began at the new Amtrak station on April 26, 1981. The station closed effective April 4, 2022. The electric interurban South Shore Line, which operates between South Bend and Chicago, stops at 11th Street station roughly a mile to the south.

References

External links

 Michigan City (MCI)--Great American Stations (Amtrak)

Amtrak stations in Indiana
Michigan City, Indiana
Railway stations in LaPorte County, Indiana
Railway stations in the United States opened in 1981
Michigan Line
Former New York, Chicago and St. Louis Railroad stations
Former New York Central Railroad stations
Railway stations closed in 2022